Ensign was a Formula One constructor from Britain. They participated in 133 grands prix, entering a total of 155 cars. Ensign scored 19 championship points and no podium finishes. The best result was a 4th place at the 1981 Brazilian Grand Prix by Marc Surer, who also took fastest lap of the race.
 
Ensign was founded by Morris Nunn who also carried out design duties during the first two seasons of the team's existence. Nunn would later go on to be a prominent chief engineer in the American-based Champ Car series, winning championships with drivers Alex Zanardi and Juan Pablo Montoya in the late 1990s.

Formula One

Von Opel had driven for the team in Formula Three in 1972 and won the Lombard North Central, British Formula Three Championship that year. Based upon that success, von Opel commissioned a Formula One chassis. Their first season was not successful, von Opel only finished two races and the team's best result that season was 13th at the 1973 British Grand Prix. However, the partnership continued into , but von Opel left after the first race of the season, having been offered a works Brabham drive. He was replaced at Ensign by Vern Schuppan whose only finish was 15th at the Belgian Grand Prix and was later himself replaced by Mike Wilds. Wilds only qualified in America; he finished the race after a pit stop for fuel but was not classified, nine laps behind.

For 1975 Ensign was sponsored by HB Bewaking (a Dutch company) leading them to sign Dutch drivers. Roelof Wunderink and Gijs van Lennep. Wunderink did not have much success, qualifying for three races and finishing one. Gijs van Lennep qualified for all his races and took sixth place in Germany, securing the first points for Ensign in Formula One. Chris Amon also raced for the team in Austria and Italy finishing 12th both times. In 1976 Amon stayed with Ensign having great qualifying results. He qualified third in Sweden and sixth in Britain but only took points in Spain where he finished in fifth place. Patrick Nève replaced Amon in France and Hans Binder replaced Amon in Austria. Jacky Ickx would race the rest of the season for Ensign.

In 1977 Clay Regazzoni raced for Ensign, scoring five points with best finishes of fifth in Italy and America. In 1978 the team entered cars for Danny Ongais and Lamberto Leoni, but Ongais left after two races and Leoni after four races. Jacky Ickx contested the next four races and Derek Daly raced the rest of the season scoring a point in Canada. Also in 1978 Nelson Piquet made his debut in Formula 1 at the German Grand Prix at the Hockenheimring driving an Ensign. In 1979 Daly stayed with Ensign but he left after the Monaco Grand Prix and was replaced by Patrick Gaillard. Gaillard only qualified at two out of five races and was replaced by Marc Surer for the final three races of the season.

In 1980 Clay Regazzoni again joined Ensign but at Long Beach Regazzoni's brake pedal broke causing him to go straight on at the Queen's Hairpin crashing into the parked car of Ricardo Zunino leaving him paralyzed. Tiff Needell raced in Belgium, but failed to qualify for the Monaco Grand Prix. Jan Lammers raced the rest of the season.

Marc Surer raced for Ensign in 1981 and finished in fourth place in Brazil where he also took fastest lap of the race. Surer also finished sixth in Monaco. Eliseo Salazar replaced Surer from Spain onwards. Salazar finished sixth in the Netherlands. In 1982 Roberto Guerrero raced for Ensign. He only finished in two races.

Meanwhile, the team was also involved in the last year of British F1 Championship, winning the championship with the old MN180B Cars and Jim Crawford as driver.

After the  season, Ensign was merged into the Theodore team, which it had previous ties to via financier Teddy Yip and took that team's name. During many seasons, the connection between Ensign and Theodore was so great that in some years they used almost the same car, much as Red Bull Racing has a second but separate team, Toro Rosso, in more recent times.

The Theodore F1 team did not last the 1983 season, though, and shut down late in the year.

Complete Formula One World Championship results
(key)
* Includes five points scored by Patrick Tambay in an Ensign N177 entered by Theodore Racing (see below).

Results of other Ensign cars
(key)

Non-championship results
(key)

References

Ensign
Formula One entrants
British auto racing teams
British racecar constructors
Auto racing teams established in 1973
Auto racing teams disestablished in 1982